The 35th National Basketball Association All-Star Game was played on February 10, 1985, at the Hoosier Dome in Indianapolis. The coaches were K. C. Jones (Boston Celtics) for the East, and Pat Riley (Los Angeles Lakers) for the West.  The MVP was Ralph Sampson, Houston (29 minutes, 24 points, 10 rebounds).

Western Conference

Eastern Conference

Score by periods
Halftime— Tied, 68-68
Third Quarter— West, 97-92

NBA All-Star Legends Classic
This event returned after a successful run from 1984, here the East was represented by the likes of Earl Monroe, Pete Maravich, Zelmo Beaty, Dave DeBusschere, Walt Frazier, Rick Barry, Tom Heinsohn, Nate Thurmond, George Yardley, Bob Davies and Bob Pettit,
The West was represented by the likes of  Roger Brown, John Havlicek, Mel Daniels, Tom Van Arsdale, Dick Van Arsdale, Oscar Robertson, Walt Bellamy, Connie Hawkins, Dave Bing, Bob Cousy and Red Kerr.

Slam Dunk Contest

The 1985 NBA Slam Dunk Contest is widely heralded as one of the greatest dunk contests of all time. It featured two of the highest flyers of the time, Michael Jordan and Dominique Wilkins. The other participants of the contest included Clyde Drexler, Julius Erving, Darrell Griffith, Larry Nance, Terence Stansbury, and Orlando Woolridge. Both Nance and Erving had first round byes due to their finishing first and second in the previous year's contest.

First round
The first round was highlighted with the only perfect score of 50 for the round by Terence Stansbury. The judges gave him a perfect score on a 360 statue of liberty dunk. The other two highs from the round were two 49's both performed by Dominique Wilkins. Clyde Drexler 122, Darrell Griffith 126, and Orlando Woolridge 124 were eliminated after the first round. Michael Jordan 130, Terence Stansbury 130, and Dominique Wilkins 145 all advanced.

Semi-finals
The semi-finals only had one perfect score of 50 and it was scored by Michael Jordan on his last dunk when he jumped from the free throw line and slammed it home with one hand. Both Terence Stansbury and Dominique Wilkins each scored a 49 in this round. The two that advanced to the finals were Michael Jordan 142 and Dominique Wilkins 140. Julius Erving 132, Larry Nance 131, and Terence Stansbury 136 were all eliminated.

Finals
In the final round Dominique Wilkins scored two 50s. On the first Wilkins bounced off the backboard and reversed it home with two hands. On the second he performed a huge two hand windmill dunk that sealed the victory for him. The final scores were Michael Jordan 136 and Dominique Wilkins 147. This was the first of many battles for slam dunk supremacy fought between Jordan and Wilkins, with round one going to Wilkins.

References

External links
 1985 NBA All Star Game Box Score
 1985 NBA All Star Game Recap
 NBA.com Year by Year Results

1985
All-Star
NBA
1980s in Indianapolis
1985 in sports in Indiana